A Gift from Bob (promoted as A Christmas Gift from Bob) is a 2020 British Christmas biographical drama film directed by Charles Martin Smith and written by Garry Jenkins, based on the non-fiction books A Gift from Bob and The Little Book of Bob by James Bowen. It is a sequel to the 2016 film A Street Cat Named Bob, and stars Luke Treadaway, reprising his role as Bowen. Anna Wilson-Jones, Kristina Tonteri-Young, and Bob the Cat co-star. It was released in the United Kingdom by Lionsgate on 6 November 2020, and is the final film appearance of Bob, who died in an accident six months after filming was completed.

Synopsis 
James looks back at the last Christmas he and Bob spent scraping a living on the streets and how Bob helped him through one of his toughest times – providing strength, friendship and inspiration – and ultimately teaching each other about the true meaning of Christmas spirit along the way.

Cast 
 Luke Treadaway as James Bowen, an ex-drug addict who is Bob's owner
 Bob the Cat as himself. 
 This is Street Cat Bob's final film appearance, as he tragically died in an accident in June 2020, approximately six months after filming was completed. The film's end credits carry a dedication in loving memory of Bob.
 Additional unnamed cats were used as stand-ins for Bob in some scenes.
 Anna Wilson-Jones as Arabella
 Kristina Tonteri-Young as Bea

Production 
Luke Treadaway reprised his role as James Bowen.

Street Cat Bob reprised his role playing himself. The film is dedicated to the titular feline, as he tragically died in an accident in June 2020 (approximately six months after filming was completed).

Charles Martin Smith was selected to direct the film in October 2019, and filming began one month later in November 2019. Filming completed in early 2020.

Music 
On 6 November 2020, an accompanying soundtrack album was released. A Christmas Gift from Bob—Original Motion Picture Soundtrack features music by Patrick Neil Doyle with songs by K.T. Wild. Three songs inspired by and written for the movie will appear in the film performed by lead actor Luke Treadaway and a fourth Coming Back To Me (Coming Home) – written and performed by K.T. himself – is played in the film’s end credit.

Release 
Originally scheduled for a 2020 release in the United Kingdom, the release was pushed back to 2021. In October 2020, it was revealed that the film is to be released on DVD and Blu-ray, and selected UK cinemas, and will be distributed by Lionsgate on 6 November 2020.

Reception 

See also
 List of Christmas films

References

External links 
 
 

2020 films
2020 biographical drama films
2020s Christmas drama films
2020s English-language films
British biographical drama films
British Christmas drama films
British sequel films
Films about cats
Films about pets
Films about writers
Films based on multiple works of a series
Films based on non-fiction books
Films directed by Charles Martin Smith
Films set in London
Films shot in London
Lionsgate films
2020s British films